Rethink Mental Illness is a mental health charity in England. The organisation was founded in 1972 by John Pringle whose son was diagnosed with schizophrenia. The operating name of 'Rethink' was adopted in 2002, and expanded to 'Rethink' Mental Illness' (to be more self-explanatory) in 2011, but the charity remains registered as the National Schizophrenia Fellowship, although it no longer focuses only on schizophrenia.

Rethink Mental Illness now has over 8,300 members, who receive a regular magazine called Your Voice. The charity states that it helps 48,000 people every year, and is for caregivers as well as those with a mental disorders. It provides services (mainly community support, including supported housing projects), support groups, and information through a helpline and publications. The Rethink Mental Illness website receives almost 300,000 visitors every year. Rethink Mental Illness carries out some survey research which informs both their own and national mental health policy, and it actively campaigns against stigma and for change through greater awareness and understanding. It is a member organisation of EUFAMI, the European Federation of Families of People with Mental Illness.

History 
John Pringle published an anonymous article in The Times on 9 May 1970, describing the ways that his son's schizophrenia diagnosis had affected his family, and what his experience caring for his son was like. This article and the support it gathered was the starting point for the National Schizophrenia Fellowship, which was founded by Pringle in 1972.

In its early days, the National Schizophrenia Fellowship acted as a support group and charity for individuals caring for loved ones diagnosed with schizophrenia. The organization was more robust than previous charities and support organizations, because of its emphasis on helping its constituents understand more about mental health, seek out community for people affected by schizophrenia, and look after their own mental health while caring for loved ones affected by mental illness.

The National Schizophrenia Fellowship was instrumental in promoting the new early psychosis paradigm in 1995 when they linked with an early psychosis network in the West Midlands, called IRIS (Initiative to reduce impact of schizophrenia).  This then led to the Early Psychosis Declaration by the World Health Organization and the subsequent formation of early psychosis services as part of mainstream health policy.

In 2002, the organization rebranded itself as Rethink to reflect its expanded focus on mental health, before later rebranding to Rethink Mental Illness in 2011.

Rethink commissioned a controversial statue of Sir Winston Churchill in a straitjacket, which was unveiled in The Forum building in Norwich on 11 March 2006, to a mixture of praise and criticism. This was part of Rethink's first anti-stigma regional campaign. The statue was intended to show how people in today's society are stigmatised by mental illness, based on claims that Churchill suffered from depression and perhaps bipolar disorder. However, the statue was condemned by Churchill's family, and described by Sir Patrick Cormack as an insult both to the former prime minister and to people with mental health problems. Although straitjackets have not been used in UK psychiatric hospitals for decades, a sufferer from bipolar disorder identified with "the straitjacket of mental illness" and commended the image. Nevertheless, in response to the complaints, the statue was removed.

Mark Winstanley succeeded Paul Jenkins as chief executive officer of Rethink Mental Illness in March 2014.

Campaigns
Amongst its recent campaigns Rethink has urged the government to look at the mental health risks of cannabis, rather than "fiddle with its legal status". Cannabis was downgraded from a Class B to a Class C drug in 2004, making most cases of possession non-arrestable. However, Rethink wants government support for new research into the relationship between severe mental illness and cannabis. They have publicly stated, in response to George Michael's advocacy of the drug, that cannabis is the drug "most likely to cause mental illness".

In 2009, Rethink launched Time to Change, a campaign to reduce mental health discrimination in England, in collaboration with MIND.  and aims to empower people to challenge stigma and speak openly about their own mental health experiences, as well as changing the attitudes and behaviour of the public towards those of us with mental health problems.

In January 2014, Rethink Mental Illness launched a campaign to “Find Mike”, a stranger who talked a 20-year-old man, Jonny Benjamin, out of taking his life in 2008. The campaign aimed to reunite the two men, with Benjamin seeking to “thank the man who saved my life” after talking him down from Waterloo Bridge, and raise awareness of mental health issues. The campaign spread quickly on social media, and within two days, the stranger’s fiancée spotted it on Facebook and knew instantly that “Mike” was her partner Neil Laybourn. The two arranged to meet, with the moment captured on Channel 4 documentary The Stranger on the Bridge, which explored the issues of the campaign. In March 2016, the Duke and Duchess of Cambridge hosted a screening of The Stranger on the Bridge at Kensington Palace, and a discussion alongside Jonny Benjamin.

Rethink Mental Illness, represented by their CEO Mark Winstanley, is a member of the independent Mental Health Taskforce. The Taskforce was responsible for developing a comprehensive five year strategy for mental health in England. It was the first time that a strategic approach has been taken to improving mental health outcomes across England’s health and social care system. NHS England welcomed the Taskforce’s recommendations, and pledged to invest more than a billion pounds a year by 2021. Health Secretary Jeremy Hunt commented on the report’s publication, saying: “We will work across Government and with the NHS to make the recommendations in this landmark report a reality, so that we truly deliver equality between mental and physical health.”

Rethink Mental Illness provides part of the secretariat for the All Party Parliamentary Group on Mental Health. They help shape the group’s agenda and organise meetings of MPs and Peers with an interest in mental health. This work has included leading enquiries on topics such as:
 Reducing premature mortality for people with mental health problems  
 Improving the quality of mental health emergency care
 Mental wellbeing as a public health priority

Mental Health UK
Rethink Mental Illness works with partner charities Support in Mind Scotland, MindWise (in Northern Ireland) and Adferiad Recovery (in Wales) as Mental Health UK, a charity registered in 2016, which "brings together the heritage and experience of four charities from across the country who have been supporting people with their mental health for nearly 50 years".

Funding

Rethink Mental Illness sets out annually its financial situation in its Trustees' Annual Report.  They report as follows:

Rethink Mental Illness has an annual income of approximately £37.5 million, according to its Directors, Trustees and Consolidated Financial Statements report for the year ended 31 March 2022.

The vast majority of this income comes from contracts to provide a wide range of mental health services commissioned by statutory sources including local governmental health and social care bodies. Currently around £1.5 million of its income derives from individual donations, membership and corporate relationships.

Rethink Mental Illness notes it protects its independent voice by making clear with funders that no donation can challenge its independence in any way, and its corporate partners sign up to a written agreement stating this position. The organisation accepts funding from pharmaceutical companies on the basis that, as with its other funders, these gifts can support its work without compromising it. It states that its discussions with pharmaceutical companies about medication and treatments will always be unrelated to any funds received from them, and that it does not endorse particular drugs or treatments. Recent contributions from pharmaceutical companies account for less than 0.1% of the charity’s overall funding.

See also
Centre for Mental Health
Improving Access to Psychological Therapies
Mental Health Foundation
Mental Health Providers' Forum
Mind
Nacro
Richmond Fellowship
Revolving Doors Agency
SANE
Stand to Reason (charity)
Together
Turning Point

General:
 Mental health in the United Kingdom

References

External links
Official site

Charities based in London
Health campaigns
Health charities in the United Kingdom
Health in the London Borough of Lambeth
Mental health organisations in the United Kingdom
Organisations based in the London Borough of Lambeth
Organizations established in 1972